Breaza is a town in Prahova County, Muntenia, Romania. The town center consists of at least two former villages, Podu Vadului and Breaza de Sus, which were later merged. Today, ten villages are administratively part of the town: Breaza de Jos, Breaza de Sus, Frăsinet, Gura Beliei, Irimești, Nistorești, Podu Corbului, Podu Vadului, Surdești, and  Valea Târsei.

History

The town's name is derived from a Slavic word, breza, meaning "birch tree".

The town was first documented in an act of 1503, mentioning a certain trader of Breaza called "Neagoe". In 1622 the land of Breaza was divided between four boyars and in 1717, the new ruler of Wallachia, Nicolae Mavrocordat gave the Breaza estate to boyar Iordache Crețulescu. The land was divided by the agrarian reform of 1921 and in 1935 it was declared a spa.

Economy
One of the main occupations is farming, and traditional needlework, but many inhabitants also commute to work in the neighboring towns of Comarnic and Câmpina. Tourism is also important for the local economy, and many locals rent out rooms in the summer months.

Due to its naturally beautiful surroundings, being located among rolling hills, the town has long been popular with inhabitants of Bucharest, who tend to have vacation homes here. Among the people who had second residences in Breaza were Adrian Păunescu.

Natives
 Ion Cavași
 Constantin Dăscălescu
 Rareș Dogaru
 Florian Enache
 Dumitru Focșeneanu
 Nicolae Pescaru

Climate
Breaza has a humid continental climate (Cfb in the Köppen climate classification).

References

Towns in Romania
Populated places in Prahova County
Localities in Muntenia
Place names of Slavic origin in Romania